Arthur Ernst Weber (3 August 1879 in Fechenheim, Germany – 7 June 1975) was a German medical doctor who studied electrocardiography, reentrant tachycardia,  phonocardiography,  radiography and their uses in diagnosing heart diseases. He published several papers in the 1920s and 1930s on the subject.

German Society for Circulation Research
Professor Arthur Weber and Professor Bruno Kisch formed the German Society for Circulation Research on 3 June 1927, "to bring forward circulation research in Germany"; this organization was later to become the German Cardiac Society.

Arthur Weber Prize
The Arthur Weber Prize Arthur Weber-Preis awarded by the German Cardiac Society as recognition of his accomplishments in the field.

References

1879 births
1975 deaths
German cardiologists
Commanders Crosses of the Order of Merit of the Federal Republic of Germany